In Greek mythology, Hyllus (/ˈhɪləs/; Ancient Greek: Ὕλλος) was the name of the following characters:

 Hyllus, a Lydian son of Gaia after whom a river was named. After this stream, Heracles named his son, Hyllus.
 Hyllus, son of Heracles and Deianira.

Notes

References 

 Hesiod, Catalogue of Women, in Hesiod: The Shield, Catalogue of Women, Other Fragments, edited and translated by Glenn W. Most, Loeb Classical Library No. 503, Cambridge, Massachusetts, Harvard University Press, 2007, 2018. . Online version at Harvard University Press.
 Pausanias, Description of Greece with an English Translation by W.H.S. Jones, Litt.D., and H.A. Ormerod, M.A., in 4 Volumes. Cambridge, MA, Harvard University Press; London, William Heinemann Ltd. 1918. Online version at the Perseus Digital Library

Children of Heracles
Children of Gaia